The 2018–19 season was S.P.A.L.'s second season in the top-flight of Italian football since 1968. After being promoted as champions of Serie B in the 2016–17 season, SPAL finished just above the relegation places in 17th during the 2017–18 season.

The season was coach Leonardo Semplici's fifth in charge of the club, after taking over in December 2014. On 3 July Semplici extended his contract with SPAL to 2020, with the option for a further year.

Players

Squad information

Transfers

In

Loans in

Out

Loans out

Competitions

Serie A

League table

Results summary

Results by round

Matches

Coppa Italia

Statistics

Appearances and goals

|-
! colspan=14 style=background:#dcdcdc; text-align:center| Goalkeepers

|-
! colspan=14 style=background:#dcdcdc; text-align:center| Defenders

|-
! colspan=14 style=background:#dcdcdc; text-align:center| Midfielders

|-
! colspan=14 style=background:#dcdcdc; text-align:center| Forwards

|-
! colspan=14 style=background:#dcdcdc; text-align:center| Players transferred out during the season

Goalscorers

Last updated: 13 April 2019

Clean sheets

* Includes one shared clean sheet against Roma.

Last updated: 13 April 2019

Disciplinary record

Last updated: 13 April 2019

References

2018-19
SPAL